Toby Schmitz (born 4 May 1977) is an Australian actor and playwright.

He was born in Perth, Western Australia, attended Perth's Scotch College and briefly studied law at the University of Western Australia. He graduated from the acting course at National Institute of Dramatic Art in 1999 and has performed many times on stage for Sydney Theatre Company, Company B at Belvoir St Theatre and Griffin Theatre Company. He has also appeared in film and television, and writes plays.

Theatre credits
His Sydney Theatre Company credits include The School for Scandal directed by Judy Davis, the premiere and national tour of David Williamson's The Great Man directed by Robyn Nevin, and leading roles in George Bernard Shaw's Major Barbara, Andrew Upton's Hanging Man, Tony McNamara's The Great, Brendan Cowell's Self Esteem, Nina Raine's Rabbit and Tom Stoppard's Travesties. Several of these productions toured to Melbourne and other Australian capital cities.

For Griffin Theatre Company, he played the central role of Luke Boyce in Louis Nowra's The Boyce Trilogy – The Woman with Dog's Eyes (2004), The Marvellous Boy (2005) and The Emperor of Sydney (2006), all directed by David Berthold.

For Company B he played the title role in Brendan Cowell's Ruben Guthrie (2008 and 2009). He performed the role of Coleman in The Lonesome West at Belvoir St Theatre in 2009. He also appeared in Strange Interlude in 2012 played the title role in Hamlet in 2013.

He also appeared in the premiere of Brendan Cowell's Men for Rogue Star Productions.

In 2000, he directed a production of Howard Korder's A Boy's Life at the Bondi Pavilion. In 2008 he directed Neil LaBute's This Is How It Goes.

In 2010, he played the eponymous character Hamlet in the enormously successful La Boite Theatre production in Brisbane, directed by David Berthold and in 2011 he played Benedick in Bell Shakespeare's Much Ado About Nothing.

In 2015, Schmitz appeared in Andrew Upton's adaptation of Chekhov's play Platonov, titled The Present, for the Sydney Theatre Company. The play was directed by John Crowley and featured Cate Blanchett, Jacqueline McKenzie, Marshall Napier, and Richard Roxburgh. That production moved in 2016/17 to the Ethel Barrymore Theatre in New York City for the Broadway debut of Schmitz and the rest of the cast.

Television credits
His many television credits include McLeod's Daughters, The Heartbreak Tour, The Cooks, White Collar Blue, Water Rats, Fat Cow Motel (ABC), Home and Away, Temptation, and the Steven Spielberg/Tom Hanks produced miniseries The Pacific.

He also be appeared in the third instalment of the Underbelly Files series of telemovies, titled 'The Man Who Got Away', portraying notorious drug smuggler and organised crime figurehead David McMillan.

In 2012, he teamed up with Angus Sampson in Season 1 of the Australian word game Randling, hosted by Andrew Denton on ABC1.

In 2014, Schmitz joined an ensemble cast in the Starz dramatic series Black Sails as historical pirate Calico Jack Rackham.

ABC series producers cast Schmitz as Lewis Hughes, a smooth and unrequited SC in the 2017 legal drama Newton's Law, starring Claudia Karvan.

Film credits
His film credits include The Rage in Placid Lake, Somersault, Agoraphobia in the Desert of the Real, The Heist, My Last Ten Hours with You, Emulsion, Solo, Heaven, Right Here Right Now, for which he was also writer and co-executive producer, and Three Blind Mice, a film which has played at numerous international film festivals and won awards including the 11th FIPRESCI International Critics Award at the London Film Festival presented to the Best Film in the World Cinema section. He also appeared in Griff the Invisible, which was released in 2010.

Schmitz as playwright
Schmitz is also an award-winning playwright. After a solid grounding in writing revue and stand-up comedy at university in Perth, Schmitz wrote his first play, while studying acting at NIDA. It was presented as a director's project there in 1998 and was later restaged at Belvoir St Theatre. In 2002, Schmitz won Sydney Theatre Company's Patrick White Playwrights' Award with his play Lucky, which was later produced by the Australian Theatre for Young People.  Chicks Will Dig You was performed as part of Company B's 2003 B Sharp season. It won the Australian National Playwrights' Centre/New Dramatists Award in 2004, and was shortlisted for the 2003 Philip Parsons Young Playwrights Award. In 2007, he wrote and directed Capture the Flag for Tamarama Rock Surfers. His other plays include This Blasted Earth, Pan, Cunt Pi, and Grazing the Phosphorus, commissioned by the National Institute of Dramatic Art.

Awards
 2010 Sydney Theatre Awards Nomination for 'Best Actor in a Supporting Role' for Measure for Measure
 2008 Sydney Theatre Awards Nomination for 'Best Actor in a Supporting Role' for The Great
 2008 Sydney Theatre Awards Nomination for 'Best Actor in a Lead Role' for Ruben Guthrie
 2004 Recipient of the Australian National Playwrights' Centre/New Dramatists Award for Chicks Will Dig You
 2003 Shortlisted for the Philip Parsons Young Playwrights Award for Chicks Will Dig You
 2002 Co-recipient of the Sydney Theatre Company/Sydney Morning Herald Patrick White Playwrights' Award for Lucky

References

 The Australian interview for Private Lives, 2012
 "Man of Many Parts": Sydney Morning Herald interview for I Want to Sleep with Tom Stoppard, 2012
 Time Out Sydney interview for Ruben Guthrie, 2009
 Putting on the Schmitz: Sydney Morning Herald interview for Travesties, 2009
 CitySearch interview for This is How It Goes, 2008
 Threedworld interview for Travesties, 2009
 Australian Stage Online interview for Ruben Guthrie, 2008

External links

Australian male stage actors
Australian male film actors
Australian male television actors
Australian people of German descent
Australian dramatists and playwrights
1977 births
Living people
People educated at Scotch College, Perth
University of Western Australia alumni
Male actors from Perth, Western Australia